Qushqava (also Romanized as Qūshqavā; also known as Qūshqarā) is a village in Qebleh Daghi Rural District, Howmeh District, Azarshahr County, East Azerbaijan Province, Iran. At the 2006 census, its population was 205, in 56 families.

References 

Populated places in Azarshahr County